Chittaranjan Giri (born 10 June 1965) is an Indian actor, who is most known for his award-winning and internationally acclaimed film The Man Beyond the Bridge (2009, Paltadacho Munis) which won in the competition category at Toronto International Film Festival.

Early life and education
Chittranjan Giri was born on 10 June 1969 in Varanasi, Uttar Pradesh. After completing elementary education and education, he went to the National School of Drama in 1993 to receive bachelor's degree and mastery of Dramatology.

Upcoming projects
Naham Avkash (Title role)

Career

Plays directed 

 Pratibimb - written by Mahesh Elkunchwar
 Parinati - written by Robin Mohom
 Gunda - written by Jay Shankar Prasad
 Sapne Chuttan Dube Ke - written by Gyan Chaturvedi 
 Gur Gobar Ganj - N.S.D. Acting Workshop Benares - written by Ashok Mishra
 The Great Raja Master Drama Co. - written by Dinesh Bharti
 Wang Chu - written by Bhisma Sahani
 Dilli Ki Deewar – written by Uday Prakash, adapted by Vibhanshu Vaibhav, for MCCC Mumbai

Lead role in plays 
 Merchant of Venice – as Shylock
 Kanu Priya – as Krishna
 Einstein – as Einstein
 Romeo Juliet aur Andhra – as Romeo

Experience 
Presently teaching acting and theatre to only selected students and working as an Actor in Film & Theatre in Mumbai

Achievements 
 Received accolades and critical appreciation in the first role as a main lead - film MAN BEYOND THE BRIDGE (Paltadacho Munis)
 Taiwan Film Festival – Maharashtra Times Best Actor nominated for Lathe Joshi
 National Short Film Festival, Malvan – Best Actor (Male) for Black Label
 Jammu Film Festival – Best Actor (Male) in Short Fiction for Black Label
 LIFFT India Filmotsav – Best Actor (Male) in Short Fiction for Black Label

Filmography
 Farzi (2023)
 BABA (2019)
 SUPER 30 (2019)
 BHONSLE (2019)
 Black Label Lead Role (2019)
 DIFFICULT PEOPLE Lead Role (2019)
 THACKREY (2019)
 LATHE JOSHI Lead Role-Winner of PIFF, Best Film (2016)
 PHANTOM (2015)
 Gulaal (2009)
 The Man Beyond the Bridge (2009) Paltadacho Munis (Winner at the TIFF - The Prize of the International Federation of Film Critics (FIPRESCI Prize))
 1971 (2007)
 Makadee (2002)
 Matrubhoomi (2003)
 Lajja (2001)
 Kasoor (2001)
 Dr. Ambedkar (2000)

References

External links
 
 
 
 

1969 births
Living people
Indian male film actors
Place of birth missing (living people)
Male actors in Hindi cinema
Male actors from Uttar Pradesh